Critical to quality is an attribute of a part, assembly, sub-assembly, product, or process that is literally critical to quality or more precisely, has a direct and significant impact on its actual or perceived quality.

See also
 Business process
 CTQ tree
 Design for Six Sigma
 Total quality management
 Total productive maintenance

References

Business terms
Quality management
Design for X
Reliability engineering
Systems engineering
Software quality